This list of 1936 motorsport champions is a list of national or international auto racing series with a Championship decided by the points or positions earned by a driver from multiple races.

Open wheel racing

Motorcycle

See also
List of motorsport championships
Auto racing

1936 in motorsport
1936